Breslauer may refer to:

People
 A person from Breslau, a former name for Wrocław, Poland
 Alfred Breslauer (1866–1954), German architect of Jewish origin
 Bernard H. Breslauer (1918–2004), German antiquarian book dealer and collector
 Chrystian Breslauer (1802–1882), Polish painter and art pedagogue
 George W. Breslauer (born 1946), American political scientist
 Hans Karl Breslauer (1888–1965), Austrian film director and screenwriter
 Kenneth Breslauer, American biochemist
 Keith M. Breslauer, Patron Capital founder
 Marianne Breslauer (1909–2001), German photographer
 Mendel Breslauer (1760–1829), Silesian writer
 Ralph Breslauer, Vertica CEO
 Rudolf Breslauer (1903–1945), German photographer of Jewish descent

Sport
 Breslauer SC 08, a German association football club
 Vereinigte Breslauer Sportfreunde, a German association football club

Other
 Breslauer Hütte, a mountain hut in the Ötztal Alps, Austria
 Breslauer Instructionen, a cataloging set of rules for scientific libraries in German-speaking countries
 Breslauer Platz/Hbf (KVB), a railway station in Cologne, Germany
 Breslauer Tumbler, a breed of domestic pigeon
 ILAB Breslauer Prize for Bibliography, awarded by the International League of Antiquarian Booksellers

See also
 

German-language surnames
Toponymic surnames
Polish toponymic surnames
German toponymic surnames
Jewish surnames
Yiddish-language surnames